The 1997 Interstate Batteries 500 was a NASCAR Winston Cup Series stock car race held on April 6, 1997, at Texas Motor Speedway in Fort Worth, Texas. The race was the inaugural Cup Series race at the track, and it was the first time Interstate Batteries served as a sponsor for NASCAR. The race was the sixth of the 1997 NASCAR Winston Cup Series season. The pace car was the Chevrolet Monte Carlo Z34 with a 3.8L engine, the first of its kind to serve as a pace car. As qualifying was canceled due to rain, the pole position was awarded to points leader Dale Jarrett of Yates Racing. Terry Labonte of Hendrick Motorsports led the most laps with 104, while Roush Racing's Jeff Burton scored his first Cup Series victory after leading 60 laps, including the final 58.

Traffic delays
As a result of the rain, besides qualifying being canceled, many of the track's parking lots were flooded. Track owner Bruton Smith received help from the Texas Department of Transportation, which closed down a portion of Texas State Highway 170 to use it as a parking lot. Although the parking lot issue was solved, traffic concerns arose, and on race day, by 8 AM, traffic on Interstate 35W stopped 16 miles south of the track. Due to the traffic, pianist Van Cliburn, who was scheduled to perform the national anthem at the race, had his helicopter delayed and could not perform.

Race
The race started with a 13-car crash on the first lap. The crash was the first in a wreck-laden race, with ten cautions and 73 laps under the yellow flag, the most in track history. Late in the race, Jeff Burton took the lead, and led the final 58 laps of the race to win his first career Cup race. Dale Jarrett finished second, followed by Bobby Labonte, Terry Labonte, and Ricky Rudd.

Results

Top 10 finishers

Standings after the race

References

Interstate Batteries 500
Interstate Batteries 500
20th century in Fort Worth, Texas
NASCAR races at Texas Motor Speedway
April 1997 sports events in the United States